Russell Adam Burnham (born September 6, 1979), is an American business owner, Physician Assistant and U.S. Army veteran. Burnham was recognized as the 2003 U.S. Army Soldier of the Year, 2007 U.S. Army Medical Corps NCO of the Year, and is an Eagle Scout. He is the great-grandson of Frederick Russell Burnham (1861–1947), recipient of the Distinguished Service Order, and famous American scout and world-traveling adventurer who helped inspire the founding of the international Scouting Movement.

Military career 
Burnham is a retired Army officer who last served as the Senior Medical Advisor Physician Assistant for the 1st Battalion, 3rd Security Forces Assistance Brigade (SFAB) at Fort Hood. As a prior enlisted Soldier, he rose to the rank of Sergeant First Class before receiving a commission in the Army Medical Specialist Corps. He served in both combat and non-combat tours in Afghanistan in support of Operation Enduring Freedom and Operation Freedom's Sentinel, was decorated with two Bronze Stars, and retired from the Army in 2021 with the rank of Major.

U.S. Army Best Warrior 
Best Warrior is an annual competition overseen by the Department of the Army as a means of identifying and recognizing soldiers in active, Special Operations, National Guard and reserve components of the United States Army. Each year, each participating command sends their best enlisted soldier and non-commissioned officer to Fort Lee to represent their unit. Burnham won the competition in his unit in 2003, and again in 2007. In 2007, Burnham was interviewed by U.S. Army Central and KIMM radio about the significance and components of the Best Warrior competition and about his duties in the Army.

U.S. Army Soldier of the Year 
Burnham was serving as an Evacuation Specialist with HHC, 1/5 Infantry Battalion at Fort Lewis, Washington, when he decided to compete in the preliminary competitions for the 2003 Soldier of the Year. After winning his battalion's honor, he went on to win the competition for 1st Brigade, 25th Infantry Division, and later for I Corps and Fort Lewis. He then competed in, and won, the U.S. Army Forces Command Soldier of the Year competition, which afforded him the opportunity to represent the largest command in the Army at the Soldier of the Year competition. Burnham won the competition, consisting of several grueling mental and physical tasks, and was reassigned to Washington, DC to serve as an ambassador for the Army. For the next year, Burnham was stationed at the Walter Reed Army Medical Center and he represented the Army at events such as: the Association of the United States Army National Convention, the Veterans of Foreign Wars National Convention, the NASCAR Daytona 500, and a Washington Redskins football game. He also joined comedian, now former Senator, Al Franken on a USO tour of Iraq and Afghanistan in December 2003.

Medical Command Noncommissioned Officer of the Year 
In 2005 Burnham was promoted to Sergeant and reassigned to Fort Sam Houston. In 2007 Staff Sergeant Burnham won the title of NCO of the Year for the U.S. Army Medical Corps. Representing MEDCOM, he competed against NCOs from all 13 major commands in the U.S. Army Best Warrior Competition, but was unable to duplicate his victory from 2003.

Physician Assistant 
Based on the board results from summer 2007 and after completing prerequisite courses at San Antonio College, Burnham attended the Interservice Physician Assistant Program at Fort Sam Houston beginning in April 2009 and graduated with a bachelor's degree in biology from the University of Nebraska Omaha in May 2010 and subsequently completed his Masters in Physician Assistant Studies at Tripler Army Medical Center in Honolulu, Hawaii in 2011. After receiving his commission, attending the Basic Officer Leader Course at Fort Sam Houston, and moving to Fort Drum, New York, he assumed his duties as Special Staff Officer to the Commander and Squadron Physician Assistant with the 1st Squadron, 89th Cavalry Regiment, 2nd Brigade Combat Team, 10th Mountain Division. 

Shortly after being promoted to Captain, Burnham completed his first tour to Afghanistan while serving as the Special Staff Officer to the Commander and Battalion Physician Assistant with the 1st Battalion, 32nd Infantry, 3rd Brigade Combat Team, 10th Mountain Division, in support of Operation Enduring Freedom 13-14, where he was awarded the Bronze Star medal and was recognized by the US Central Command Surgeon for outstanding leadership and battlefield medicine with the inaugural Ditch Medicine Award.

Upon returning to the United States, Burnham was selected to attend the Army Medical Departments Captain’s Career Course, located at Fort Sam Houston, Texas as well as the U.S. Army Flight Surgeon Course in Fort Rucker, Alabama. After earning the U.S. Army Flight Surgeon Badge, Burnham was temporarily assigned to Headquarters and Headquarters Battalion (HHBN), 1st Cavalry Division, Fort Hood, Texas before being assigned to the 1st Battalion 227th Attack Reconnaissance Battalion (ARB) within the 1st Air Cavalry Brigade at Fort Hood.

After completing almost 4 years in Army Aviation, Burnham was once again hand selected as the first physician assistant to serve in the newly formed 3rd Security Force Assistance Brigade at Fort Hood. Burnham once again deployed to eastern Afghanistan in the fall of 2019 in support of Operation Resolute Support and served as the senior medical advisor to the Afghan National Army’s 201st Corps Division Surgeon as well as to the Commander of the Gamberi Regional Military Hospital. Upon returning from Afghanistan, Burnham retired with more than 20 years of active federal service.

Awards and decorations 
Burnham's decorations and badges include the following:

Other awards
 1995 Eagle Scout (Boy Scouts of America)
 2003 U.S. Army Soldier of the Year
 American Legion 2004 Military Spirit of Service award for his work with the Boy Scouts while stationed at Fort Belvoir.
 2007 U.S. Army Medical Command NCO of the Year
 Sergeant Audie Murphy Award
 Ditch Medicine Award (2014)

Lineage

Burnham is a descendant of Thomas Burnham (1617–1688) of Hartford, Connecticut, the first American ancestor of a large number of Burnhams. The descendants of Thomas Burnham have been noted in every American war, including the French and Indian war.
 Frederick Russell Burnham (Great-grandfather) - A highly decorated British Army scout, fought in the First Matabele War, Second Matabele War, and the Second Boer War; taught scouting to Robert Baden-Powell, becoming one of the inspirations for the founding of the international Scouting Movement; named an Honorary Scout by the Boy Scouts of America. Mount Burnham is named after this man.
 Roderick Deane Burnham (Grandfather - paternal) - U.S. Army infantry in World War I, fought in France.
 Dresden Gordon "Red" Taylor (Grandfather - maternal) - U.S. Army engineer in World War II; landed in a glider on Utah Beach during D-Day and fought in the Battle of the Bulge.
 Frederick Russell Burnham II (Father) - U.S. Army communications, fought in Vietnam; served as a troop leader in the Boy Scouts of America.

Business Owner
Burnham is the Founder and Team Principle at Front Line Mobile Health, PLLC, a Texas based health care company that provides health and wellness programs to public safety organizations throughout the state. He continues to use his military experience to influence change as it relates to the health and safety of public servants. In 2021, he participated in health & safety training for Firefighter Nation on the topic of: Getting Firefighters Back to Work After COVID-19.

Personal life
A native of Tucson, Arizona, Burnham has earned an associate degree from Rio Salado College and Bachelor and Master of Science degrees in Physician Assistant Studies from the University of Nebraska Medical Center. He is a Boy Scouts of America volunteer and is married with seven children.

Footnotes

1979 births
Living people
Military personnel from Tucson, Arizona
United States Army soldiers